Caldicochlea harrisi is a species of freshwater mollusc in the family, Tateidae, 

The species was first described in 1996 as Dalhousia harrisi by Winston Ponder, Donald Colgan, T. Terzis, Stephanie Clark and Alison Miller. However, the genus name of Dalhousia had already been used, and thus in 1997, Ponder published the replacement genus name of Caldicochlea.

Description
The snails are tiny (adults from 2.3 to 3.8mm) and vary highly in shell shape, making them hard to distinguish on shell morphology from C. globosa, but C. harrisi is usually smaller and more conical.

Distribution
It is endemic to the Dalhousie Springs of the Great Artesian Basin.

Habitat
These snails are found in a range of habitats:  small cold seeps (20°C), large warm to hot pools  (to 43°C), and on the edges of  large pools where they are not reachable by catfish (known to eat tateid snails).

References

External links 
 Australian Freshwater Molluscs. Revision 1A: Caldicochlea harrisi (Ponder, Colgan, Terzis, Clark & Miller, 1996)  (full description)

Taxa named by Winston Ponder
Taxa described in 1996
Tateidae